Two ships of the Royal Navy have borne the name HMS Blackpool, after the Lancashire seaside town of Blackpool:

 was a  launched in 1940 and sold in 1946.
 was a  launched in 1957. She was loaned to the Royal New Zealand Navy between 1966 and 1971 and was sold for scrapping in 1978.

Royal Navy ship names